Brian McDermott was a 10-year-old schoolboy who disappeared in Belfast, Northern Ireland in 1973. He was last seen at Ormeau Park on 2 September 1973. He failed to return to his home on Well Street in the lower Woodstock Road area of Cregagh, Belfast. A week after he went missing, the River Lagan was lowered and a sack containing some of his remains was found.

Kincora Boys Home
In 1982 a possible link between the death of Brian McDermott and the abuse scandal at Kincora Boys' Home was discussed by Jim Prior, Michael Havers, senior civil servant Sir William Bourne and then Secretary of State for Northern Ireland and then Lord Chancellor Quintin Hogg. Papers concerning this meeting were released in 2013.

Brother investigated
Brian's brother William was 16 at the time of his disappearance. He was considered a suspect and questioned in 1976 and again in 2004. William denies the allegations and is estranged from the rest of his family. He admits confessing in 1976, but says that the confession was coerced. He changed his name by deed poll to avoid the stigma of being a suspect in his brother's murder. Brian's murder remains unsolved.

See also 
List of solved missing person cases
List of unsolved murders

References

1960s births
1973 deaths
1973 in Northern Ireland
1973 murders in the United Kingdom
20th century in Belfast
20th-century people from Northern Ireland
Male murder victims
Missing person cases in Northern Ireland
Murder in Northern Ireland
Unsolved murders in Northern Ireland
Murdered British children
1970s in Northern Ireland